James Darcy may refer to:
 James Darcy (1617–1673), English politician
 James Darcy, 1st Baron Darcy of Navan (c. 1650–1731), his son, British politician and peer
 James Darcy (New York politician) (1834–1863), member of the New York State Assembly
 James Riabhach Darcy, mayor of Galway, 1602–1603
 Jim Darcy (1875–1932), Australian rules footballer

See also
 James D'Arcy, English actor